Punyamurthula Suryanarayana Murthy, known by his screen name Chitti Babu, is an Indian actor and comedian, known for his works predominantly in Telugu cinema. He is the brother of noted comedians Raja Babu and Ananth Babu.

Personal life 
Chitti Babu was born in Amalapuram Andhra Pradesh, to Punyamurthula Umamaheswara Rao and Ramanamma as SuryaNarayana Murthy. His elder brother is well-known Telugu comedian Raja Babu and his younger brother, Ananth Babu, is also a Tollywood comedian. 
He has campaigned for the Congress party by staging plays in Nalgonda in 2009.

Filmography

Television
 Janaki Kalaganaledu as Kanna Rao
 "Paan Parakasta" episodes of Amrutham (TV series)

References

External links 
 MaaStars.com
 TeluguCinemaInfo.com

Telugu male actors
Telugu comedians
Indian male comedians
Indian male film actors
Living people
Year of birth missing (living people)